Laxman Singh Gaur (11 July 1958 – 11 February 2008) was an Indian politician and the higher education minister of Madhya Pradesh.  He upgraded the functionality of the education system in Madhya Pradesh.  He died in a car accident near Dewas on 11 February 2008.

References

1958 births
2008 deaths
Bharatiya Janata Party politicians from Madhya Pradesh
Madhya Pradesh MLAs 1993–1998
Madhya Pradesh MLAs 1998–2003
Madhya Pradesh MLAs 2003–2008
Road incident deaths in India
Politicians from Indore